Scarborough or Scarboro may refer to:

People 
 Scarborough (surname)
 Earl of Scarbrough

Places

Australia 
 Scarborough, Western Australia, suburb of Perth
 Scarborough, New South Wales, suburb of Wollongong
 Scarborough, Queensland, suburb in the Moreton Bay Region

Canada
 Scarborough, Toronto, an administrative district and former city in Ontario, Canada
 Scarborough GO Station, a train station of GO Transit in Toronto
 Scarborough City Centre, a neighbourhood in Toronto
 Scarborough Town Centre, a shopping mall in Toronto
 Scarborough Village, a neighbourhood in Toronto
 Scarborough Bluffs, a geological escarpment in Toronto
 Scarborough Formation (Ontario), a geologic formation in Ontario, Canada
 Scarboro, Calgary, a neighbourhood in Calgary, Alberta

United Kingdom 
 Scarborough, North Yorkshire
 Scarborough railway station, in Scarborough, North Yorkshire.
 Scarborough (borough), local government district
 Scarborough (UK Parliament constituency), which existed from 1295 until 1918, and from 1974 to 1997
 Scarborough Castle, located in North Yorkshire
 Scarborough Mere, a natural lake in the Weaponness Valley, Scarborough, England
 Scarborough Formation, a geologic formation in England

United States 
 Scarboro, Georgia, an unincorporated community
 Scarborough, Maine, a town
 Scarborough (CDP), Maine, now Oak Hill, a census-designated place in the town
 Scarborough, New York, a hamlet in Briarcliff Manor
 Scarborough (Metro-North station), a Metro-North station serving the village
 Scarborough Day School, a defunct private school in the hamlet
 Scarborough Renaissance Festival in Waxahachie, Texas
 Scarborough Beach (Rhode Island) in Narragansett, Rhode Island

Elsewhere 
 Scarborough, New Zealand, a suburb of Christchurch
 Scarborough, Cape Town, South Africa, on the west coast of the Cape Peninsula
 Scarborough Shoal, a group of islands in the South China Sea disputed by the People's Republic of China, the Republic of China and Philippines
 Scarborough, Tobago, a capital city in Trinidad and Tobago

Ships
 HMS Scarborough, the name of several ships of Britain's Royal Navy
 Scarborough (East Indiaman), three ships of the British East India Company

Sport
 Scarborough F.C., a football club formerly based in Scarborough, England
 Scarborough Athletic F.C., a football club created by the supporters' trust of the old club
 Scarborough Cricket Club (England), cricket club, also a home ground of Yorkshire County Cricket Club
 Scarborough Cricket Club (Australia), cricket club based in Western Australia
 Scarborough Pirates, a now defunct former professional rugby league club
 Scarborough Pirates ARLFC, a now defunct amateur rugby league club
 Scarborough RUFC, an amateur rugby union club
 Scarborough Sting, a now defunct ice hockey team based in Ontario, Canada
 Scarborough Sabres, a now defunct ice hockey team based in Canada

Other uses 
 The Scarborough News, a local newspaper for Scarborough, England
 Scarborough (2018 film), a 2018 film set in Scarborough, North Yorkshire 
 Scarborough (2021 film), a 2021 Canadian drama film directed by Shasha Nakhai and Rich Williamson
 Scarborough Van Assembly, a former General Motors Assembly plant in Ontario, Canada
 Scarborough Raid, an attack on the town of Scarborough, North Yorkshire by the Imperial German Navy
 Scarborough Research, a company researching consumer media habits, a joint venture between Nielsen Company and Arbitron
 Scarbrough Stakes, a horse race, held at Doncaster Racecourse
 Scarborough (TV series) a 2019 BBC comedy series

See also
 
 
 Scarborough Centre (disambiguation)
 Scarborough Fair (disambiguation)
 Scarborough North (disambiguation)
 Scarborough station (disambiguation)
 Scarbrough, a surname 
 Skaraborg (disambiguation)